Change 21 was a parliamentary group for the congressional term of 2016 to 2021 in the Congress of Peru. The group was introduced on 20 March 2018, led by then-congressman Kenji Fujimori, and was formally recognized on 19 December of the same year by the President of Congress Daniel Salaverry. Its members are former members of Popular Force. The parliamentary group was disbanded following the dissolution of the Congress on 30 September 2019 by President Martin Vizcarra.

History 
On 21 December 2017, proposals to impeach President Pedro Pablo Kuczynski reached the floor of Congress. Ultimately, the proposal to impeach the president failed as 10 members of the majority opposition party Popular Force voted against removing Kuczynski from the presidency. On 31 December 2017, the party's Disciplinary Committee recommended dismissing the ten members from Popular Force. On 1 March 2018, following dismissal from the party, Kenji Fujimori resigned from the leadership of the Fujimorist faction, changing moving towards a more progressive and liberal agenda. Later in January, Fujimori informally nicknamed his group as the Avengers, a reference to the fictional film Avengers: Infinity War. On 20 March, the informal group announced the creation of the political faction Cambio 21 with plans to become an official political party with the incarcerated former president Alberto Fujimori as leader.

On 19 December, the President of Congress Daniel Salaverry formally recognized the faction.

Congressional members 
Current congressional members of Change 21 are former members of Popular Force: Estelita Bustos, Maritza García, Clayton Galván, Marvin Palma, Luis Yika, Yesenia Ponce, Roberto Vieira and Lizbeth Robles.

Guillermo Bocángel, Bienvenido Ramírez and Kenji Fujimori were suspended from Congress before the formal recognition of Change 21 as a congressional faction.

References

2018 establishments in Peru
2019 disestablishments in Peru
Defunct political parties in Peru
Fujimorism
Parliamentary groups in Peru
Political parties disestablished in 2019
Political parties established in 2018